Leukocyte immunoglobulin-like receptor subfamily A member 3 (LILR-A3) also known as CD85 antigen-like family member E (CD85e), immunoglobulin-like transcript 6 (ILT-6), and leukocyte immunoglobulin-like receptor 4 (LIR-4) is a protein that in humans is encoded by the LILRA3 gene located within the leukocyte receptor complex on chromosome 19q13.4. Unlike many of its family, LILRA3 lacks a transmembrane domain. The function of LILRA3 is currently unknown; however, it is highly homologous to other LILR genes, and can bind human leukocyte antigen (HLA) class I. Therefore, if secreted, the LILRA3 might impair interactions of membrane-bound LILRs (such as LILRB1, an inhibitory receptor expressed on effector and memory CD8 T cells) with their HLA ligands, thus modulating immune reactions and influencing susceptibility to disease.

Like the closely related LILRA1, LILRA3 binds to both normal and 'unfolded' free heavy chains of HLA class I, with a preference for free heavy chains of HLA-C alleles

See also 
 Cluster of differentiation

References

Further reading

External links 
 
 

Clusters of differentiation
Immunoglobulin superfamily